De Coster's worm lizard (Monopeltis decosteri), also known commonly as De Coster's spade-snouted worm lizard and De Coster's worm-lizard, is a species of amphisbaenian in the family Amphisbaenidae. The species is indigenous to southern Africa.

Etymology
The specific name, decosteri, is in honor of Belgian Consul Juste De Coster, who was stationed at Delagoa Bay, Mozambique.

Geographic range
M. decosteri is found in Mozambique, South Africa, and Zimbabwe.

Habitat
The preferred natural habitat of M. decosteri is moist savanna with sandy soil.

Description
In life M. decosteri is pinkish white dorsally and ventrally. Preserved specimens in alcohol are yellowish white.

Reproduction
M. decosteri is viviparous.

References

Further reading
Bates MF, Branch WR, Bauer AM, Burger M, Marais J, Alexander GJ, de Villiers MS (editors) (2014). Atlas and Red List of the Reptiles of South Africa, Lesotho and Swaziland. Suricata 1. Pretoria: South African National Biodiversity Institute (SANBI). xvii + 485 pp. . (Monopeltis decoster, p. 153).
Boulenger GA (1910). "A Revised List of the South African Reptiles and Batrachians, with Synoptic Tables, special reference to the specimens in the South African Museum, and Descriptions of New Species". Annals of the South African Museum 5: 455–538. (Monopeltis decosteri, new species, p. 495).
Gans C (2005). "Checklist and Bibliography of the Amphisbaenia of the World". Bulletin of the American Museum of Natural History (289): 1–130. (Monopeltis decosteri, p. 35).

Monopeltis
Reptiles of Mozambique
Reptiles of South Africa
Reptiles of Zimbabwe
Reptiles described in 1910
Taxa named by George Albert Boulenger